Maharaja Sriram Chandra Bhanja Deo University (MSCB University), formerly North Orissa University (NOU), is a public university in the regional city of Baripada in the state of Odisha, India. 

This university mainly provides higher education through on-campus as well as distance education modes. It aims to provide job-oriented technical courses.

History
The Government of Odisha under the Section 32 of the Odisha University Act, 1989 (Act 5 of 1989), established the Maharaja Sriram Chandra Bhanja Deo University and notified vide notification No. 880 dated 13 July 1998. The university is included in the list of Universities maintained under section 2 (f) of the University Grants Commission Act, 1956, to impart higher education in the Tribal base area of Northern Odisha.

On 23 December 2020, the 150th birth anniversary of Maharaja Sriram Chandra Bhanja Deo, CM of Odisha announced that North Orissa University of Mayurbhanj district will now be known as Maharaja Sriram Chandra Bhanja Deo University as the institution has been renamed after the erstwhile King of the princely state of Mayurbhanj.

Campuses 

Maharaja Sriram Chandra Bhanja Deo University has two campuses, a main campus in Baripada, the district headquarters of Mayurbhanj, Odisha and a second campus at Suleikhamar, near Kendujhargarh in Kendujhar district.

Colleges 
Its jurisdiction extends to Mayurbhanj district. The university affiliates 65 Colleges in Mayurbhanj, including 2 Autonomous Colleges, 1 Law Colleges, 2 B.Ed. Colleges.

Accreditation 
MSCB was accredited by National Assessment and Accreditation Council (NAAC) with an B+ grade with a score of 2.56 out of 4 points.

References

External links
 

 
Universities in Odisha
Department of Higher Education, Odisha
Educational institutions established in 1998
1998 establishments in Orissa
Mayurbhanj district